Legends of Aria or LoA (formerly Shards Online) is a fantasy-based indie MMORPG. It was developed by Citadel Studios Inc., a gaming company founded by the lead developer of Ultima Online.

Gameplay

The game is available in English and is free-to-play with options to buy "Packages," such as the Citizen Pack that allows building houses, shops, and gives extra bank slots in the game. LoA is based on a 3D isometric view.

There are limited tutorials and missions in the game. The story is not predetermined, and the players can develop different skills at a limit of 600 points. There are many ways to play the game, including full-loot Player versus Player combat.

History

LoA was developed in 8 years by the lead developer of Ultima Online and his company Citadel Studios. Its beta version was launched in August 2019, and the final game was launched almost a year later, in July 2020. The first DLC was released in March 2021. The game was formerly launched from a Kickstarter campaign and originally named Shards Online.

On February 23, 2022, the game posted on its official Twitter account that LoA was soon to integrate blockchain in its system, making the game a free-to-play and play-to-earn MMO. It will use ARIA Tokens as a cryptocurrency and game characters as NFTs. The blockchain relaunch will also include an overhaul of the game, improving graphics, adding in a new camera angle, and developing new content (like boats, in-game poker, and a new world). This relaunch of the game will be published and owned by Reaper Games, a joint-venture between the founder of Citadel Studios and crypto-entrepreneur Joseph Rubin.

Reception

The online community has widely reviewed the game, including PC Gamer calling it Ultima Online's "Spiritual Successor" and MMORPG.com rating it 60 out of 100.

Awards

Pax East 2014 Award – Best Indie MMO
Pax East 2017 Award – Best Indie MMO

References

External links
Official site
Citadel Studios

Massively multiplayer online role-playing games
2020 video games
Fantasy video games
Blockchain games
Video games developed in the United States
Windows games
Windows-only games